Virginia's 27th House of Delegates district elects one of 100 seats in the Virginia House of Delegates, the lower house of the state's bicameral legislature. District 27 represents part of Chesterfield County, Virginia. As of 2017, the seat is held by Republican Roxann Robinson.

District officeholders

References

Virginia House of Delegates districts
Government in Chesterfield County, Virginia